Ira Clifton Brownlie (April 11, 1873 – December 8, 1956) was an American football and baseball coach. He was the first head football coach at Iowa Agricultural College and Model Farm—now known as Iowa State University—serving for one season in 1892 and compiling a record of 1–0–1. He was also the head baseball coach at Iowa Agricultural in 1898, tallying a mark of 2–4.

Brownlie was born in Long Grove, Iowa and attended high school in Davenport, Iowa. He later moved to Colorado, where he worked as a dentist. He died in Denver, Colorado on December 8, 1956.

Head coaching record

Football

References

1873 births
1956 deaths
American dentists
19th-century players of American football
Iowa State Cyclones baseball coaches
Iowa State Cyclones football coaches
Iowa State Cyclones football players
Northwestern University Dental School alumni
Sportspeople from Davenport, Iowa
Coaches of American football from Iowa
Players of American football from Iowa